Eurolimnornis is the name given to a monotypic genus of pterosaurs from the Early Cretaceous. The only known species E. corneti probably was originally identified as a primitive but essentially modern bird (or even as an early neognathe ancestral to the grebes), although alternative theories later suggested that it was a non-avialan theropod or pterosaur. The identification as a pterosaur was supported by a re-evaluation of the fossil remains published in 2012.

The holotype and only material known to date (MTCO-P 7896) is a distal fragment of the right humerus, which was at first ascribed to the same species as the specimen of Palaeocursornis corneti, a possible synonym also originally identified as a bird.

The remains were found in Berriasian deposits (around 143 mya) at Cornet near Oradea, Romania. Eurolimnornis occurred on what was then an archipelago of volcanic and coral islands towards the east of the Piemont-Liguria Ocean. Its habitat was hilly, karstic terrain with numerous freshwater and/or brackish rivers, lakes and swamps. As this archipelago lay around 35°N latitude in a warmer, wetter climate than exists today, it was roughly similar to today's Caribbean or Indonesia.

See also
 List of pterosaur genera
 Timeline of pterosaur research

References

Pterodactyloids
Early Cretaceous pterosaurs of Europe
Fossil taxa described in 1986